Aristaenetus  was an ancient Greek epistolographer who flourished in the 5th or 6th century. Under his name, two books of love stories, in the form of letters, are extant; the subjects are borrowed from the erotic elegies of such Alexandrian writers as Callimachus, and the language is a patchwork of phrases from Plato, Lucian, Alciphron and others.

Texts
Boissonade (1822); Hercher, Epistolographi Graeci (1873).
English translations: Abel Boyer (1701); Thomas Brown (1715); R. B. Sheridan and Nathaniel Halhed (1771 and later).

References

External links
 The Love Epistles of Aristænetus 1771 Translated by Richard Brinsley Sheridan, 1751-1816
Epistolographi graeci, R. Hercher (ed.), Parisiis, editore Ambrosio Firmin Didot, 1873, pp. 133-171.

5th-century Byzantine people
6th-century Byzantine people
Ancient Greek writers